Our Christmas is a 1990 compilation Christmas album released jointly on Reunion Records and Word Records. This is the second of a three-album trilogy from Word Records using the word "Our" following the release of Our Hymns (1989) and the upcoming Our Family (1992). Like Our Hymns, Our Christmas features Christmas songs done by CCM artists' interpretation and styles of music. Highlights include a duet with Amy Grant and Sandi Patti singing a medley of "It Came Upon the Midnight Clear" and "O Little Town of Bethlehem" and "One Small Child" recorded by David Meece, a song he wrote back in 1971 and has since been covered by many Christian artists including Evie, First Call and Rebecca St. James. Our Christmas peaked at number 3 on the Billboard Top Christian Albums chart.

Track listing

Note: the track "Reve du Noel" performed by Michael W. Smith is a medley consisting of "Sing We Now of Christmas," "Jesu, Joy of Man's Desiring" and Smith's own composition of "Emmanuel."

Charts

References

1990 Christmas albums
Word Records albums
Reunion Records albums